Be My Lady is a 2016 Philippine drama television series directed by Theodore Boborol, starring Erich Gonzales and Daniel Matsunaga. The series premiered on ABS-CBN's PrimeTanghali noontime block and worldwide on The Filipino Channel from January 18, 2016, to November 25, 2016, replacing Ningning, and was replaced by Langit Lupa.

Plot
Burdened by hospital and day to day expenses, Marcela the matriarch had no other choice but to work in Singapore as a nanny to reclaim the farm and help provide for the basic needs for the family. With Marcy in Singapore, Pinang was tasked to be the “ilaw ng tahanan”. And she does so with all her heart.  On the other hand, Marcy  works to tame the naughty Philip Olivera in Singapore. Phil was a troubled child, a KSP kid for he wasn’t cared for by her busy mom. He found a mother’s warmth in Marcy. Just when Marcy and Phil were starting to get close, Phil accidentally got Marcy deported  for shoplifting. Marcy’s deportation marked another difficult hardship in the life of the family. The family farm which is their most prized possession was seized by the lending company where it was pawned.

At present, Pinang’s family strives to get the farm back. Pinang aspires to be a nurse in UK. Her focus and goal is to be successful, no lovelife, no time for romance.  She grew up to be a woman with firm and strict principles. Then, as fate would have it, Pinang met Phil. The reason for all of the family’s hardship. Just the mere sight of him makes her mad. But the more she gets to know him, the more she falls for him. In return, Phil learns what it’s like to be a Filipino, have a complete family and fall in love with a Filipina.

Cast and characters

Main cast
Erich Gonzales as Filipina "Pinang" B. Crisostomo-Oliviera
Daniel Matsunaga as Philip "Phil" Oliviera

Supporting cast
 Janice de Belen as Marcela "Nanay Marcy" Bernabe-Crisostomo
 Al Tantay as Emilio "Tatay Emil" Crisostomo
 Priscilla Meirelles-Estrada as Chelsea Oliviera
 Yayo Aguila as Elsa Soliman
 Loisa Andalio as Margaret Soliman
 Yves Flores as Julian Crisostomo
 Karen Dematera as Nurse Miguela "Miggy" Soliman
 MJ Cayabyab as Nurse Narciso "Nars" Malvar
 RK Bagatsing as Macario "Kuya Mackie" Crisostomo
 Mike Lloren as Andres "Andy" Crisostomo
 Ana Abad-Santos as Soledad "Sol" Alvarez-Crisostomo
 Almira Muhlach as Anita Crisostomo
 Franchesca Floirendo as Gabriella "Gab" Crisostomo
 Nonoy Froilan as Apolinario "Lolo Apo" Bernabe
 Nathaniel Britt as James Mariano

Guest cast
 Gwen Zamora as Sophia Elizalde
 Geoff Eigenmann as Doc. Joselito Mariano
 Mark Rivera as Johann Villanueva
 Richard Juan as Kevin Go
 Jason Dy as Emerson Francisco
 Mari Kaimo as Akiro Hiroshi

Special participation
 Bruce Roeland as young Phil
 Francine Diaz as young Pinang

Series overview

List of episodes

Chapter 1

Chapter 2

Chapter 3 
{| style="text-align:center; font-size:100%; line-height:18px;" class="wikitable" width="100%"
! style="background:#87CEFA; color:#000000" width=5%|№
! style="background:#87CEFA; color:#000000" width=5%|№ in season
! style="background:#87CEFA; color:#000000"|Title
! style="background:#87CEFA; color:#000000"|Date Aired
|-
|182
|1
|'Confidential'
|October 3, 2016
|-
|183
|2
|'Discovery '
|October 4, 2016
|-
|184
|3
|'Para Kay Tay Emil'
|October 5, 2016
|-
|185
|4
|'Pamana'
|October 6, 2016
|-
|186
|5
|'Keep The Faith'
|October 7, 2016
|-
|187
|6
|'Pag-Asa'
|October 10, 2016
|-
|188
|7
|'Pray For Emil'
|October 11, 2016
|-
|189
|8
|'Buhay'
|October 12, 2016
|-
|190
|9
|'Game Plan'
|October 13, 2016
|-
|191
|10
|New Life'|October 14, 2016
|-
|192|11|'Kayang Kaya'|October 17, 2016
|-
|193|12|'Be Positive'
|October 18, 2016
|-
|194|13|'Fight'
|October 19, 2016
|-
|195|14|'For Sale'
|October 20, 2016
|-
|196|15|'Solusyon'
|October 21, 2016
|-
|197|16|'Grand Opening'|October 24, 2016
|-
|198|17|'Diskarte'|October 25, 2016
|-
|199|18|'Welcome Home' |October 26, 2016
|-
|200|19|'Bagong Pangarap'|October 27, 2016
|-
|201|20|'Acceptance'|October 28, 2016
|-
|202|21|'Much Awaited'|October 31, 2016
|-
|203|22|'Therapy'|November 1, 2016
|-
|204|23|'Second Chance'|November 2, 2016
|-
|205|24|'Engagement Ring'|November 3, 2016
|-
|206|25|'The Proposal''''|November 4, 2016
|-
|}

 Chapter 4 

Reception
Ratings
Based on the data provided by AGB Nielsen, Be My Lady and Princess in the Palace only had a 0.6 difference in TV ratings. Princess in the Palace still had the upper hand after scoring 11.9% in Mega Manila. Be My Lady came close with 11.3% during its pilot episode.
However, Be My Lady had a strong pilot episode based on nationwide TV ratings by Kantar/TNS Media. The Erich Gonzales-Daniel Matsunaga starer garnered 18.7%, which is twice that of Princess in the Palace's 8.2% national rating.

RerunBe My Lady re-aired on Kapamilya Channel, Kapamilya Online Live and A2Z on February 21 to December 30, 2022, on Kapamilya Gold afternoon block replacing the re-runs of Nang Ngumiti ang Langit and replaced by the re-runs of A Soldier's Heart.''

See also
 List of programs broadcast by ABS-CBN
 List of telenovelas of ABS-CBN

References

External links

ABS-CBN drama series
Philippine romantic comedy television series
2016 Philippine television series debuts
2016 Philippine television series endings
Filipino-language television shows
Television shows filmed in the Philippines
Television shows filmed in Singapore
Television shows filmed in Cambodia